The Notre Dame Fighting Irish Men's Basketball team is the intercollegiate men's basketball program representing the University of Notre Dame in Notre Dame, Indiana, United States. The program competes in the Atlantic Coast Conference of NCAA Division I. On September 12, 2012, Notre Dame announced they would be moving to the Atlantic Coast Conference; they joined the conference on July 1, 2013. The school holds two retroactively awarded national championships in basketball from the Helms Foundation: for the 1927 (19–1 overall record) and 1936 (22–2–1 overall record) seasons. They have also played in the NCAA tournament 36 times, good for 9th all time, and reached the Final Four in 1978. The Irish hold the record for most Tournament appearances without a championship or championship game appearance, one of five teams (along with Texas, Temple, Illinois and Oklahoma) to have 30 or more appearances without a title and one of three teams (along with Texas and Temple) to have more than 30 appearances without either. They are also the first Big East team to go undefeated at home two straight seasons. They play their home games in the Purcell Pavilion at the Edmund P. Joyce Center. Since moving to the Purcell Pavilion in 1968, they have had 44 winning seasons at the Purcell Pavilion, including 5 undefeated seasons at home (1973, 1985, 2006, 2007, and 2010) and have had only 4 losing seasons at the Purcell Pavilion (1971, 1981, 1992, and 1995). Jeff Sagarin and ESPN listed the program 12th in the college basketball all-time rankings in the ESPN College Basketball Encyclopedia. The Fighting Irish are currently coached by Mike Brey.

History

Postseason

NCAA tournament results
The Fighting Irish have appeared in the NCAA tournament 37 times.

From 2011–2015 the round of 64 was known as the Second Round, Round of 32 was Third Round

NCAA tournament seeding history

The NCAA began seeding the tournament with the 1979 edition.

Best Single-Game Scoring Performances

NIT results
The Fighting Irish have appeared in the National Invitation Tournament (NIT) 12 times. Their combined record is 27–12.

Traditions

Accomplishments

National Championships
The Irish were awarded two Helms Athletic Foundation National Championships.
1926–27 Helms Foundation National Champions
1935–36 Helms Foundation National Champions

Upsets of Number 1's and unbeatens

The wins include several wins over the defending NCAA Tournament Champion. Both wins over UCLA were in seasons immediately following UCLA claiming the NCAA Championship with the 1971 win coming over a team that would be the eventual tournament champion.  The 1954 win in the NCAA tournament over Indiana prevented IU from back-to-back national titles after claiming the 1953 NCAA Tournament Title.  The 1978 win over Marquette was another instance of the Irish defeating the defending national champion.  The 1948 win over Kentucky saw the Irish defeat the eventual Tournament champion who would go on to win both the 1948 and 1949 titles. The 1948 win over NYU was a victory over the eventual NIT runner-up, in a time where the prestige of the NIT tournament rivaled that of the NCAA tournament.

Also of note is that the 2005 win over Boston College and the 2012 win over Syracuse saw 20–0 teams traveling to South Bend and leaving with their first loss of the season.  Boston College, in its final year as a member of the Big East, set the record for most consecutive wins by a Big East team to start a season.  The 2012 Syracuse team began the game against the Irish with the goal of breaking Boston College's record.  As in 2005, the Irish defeated Syracuse and cemented their place as the streak stopper.

Notes

Coaches

Current coaching staff
The current coaching staff is as follows.
Head coach – Mike Brey
Associate Head Coach – Rod Balanis
Assistant coach – Ryan Humphrey
Interim Assistant Coach – Scott Martin
Director of Basketball Operations – Harold Swanagan

All-time coaching records

Mike Brey became the all-time wins leader for Notre Dame head coaching.  It was in an 88-58 win against North Carolina State in the 2017-18 season.

Coaching awards
National Coach of the Year
Digger Phelps – 1974 (UPI), 1987 (Basketball Weekly)
Mike Brey – 2011 (AP, Henry Iba Award, CBS Sports.com, Sports Illustrated), 2012 (Jim Phelan Coach of the Year Award)

Skip Prosser Man of the Year Award
Mike Brey – 2008

Big East Coach of the Year
John MacLeod – 1997
Mike Brey – 2007, 2008, 2011

National Association of Basketball Coaches (NABC) District V Coach of the Year
Mike Brey – 2011, 2012

Players

National Players of the Year
Austin Carr – 1971 – AP, UPI, Helms(shared)
Adrian Dantley – 1976 – U.S. Basketball Writers Association
John Moir – 1936 – Helms

National Freshman of the Year
Chris Thomas – 2002 – Basketball Times, Basketball News

Consensus All-Americans

Notre Dame leads all schools with 3 of the 18 total 3-time Consensus All-American selections.

Austin Carr – 1971
Adrian Dantley – 1975
Jerian Grant – 2015
Leo Klier – 1944, 1946
Edward "Moose" Krause – 1932, 1933, 1934
John Moir – 1936, 1937, 1938
Troy Murphy – 2000, 2001
Paul Nowak – 1936, 1937, 1938
Kevin O'Shea – 1948
Bob Rensberger – 1943
John Shumate – 1974

John Wooden All-Americans
Luke Harangody – 2008
Troy Murphy – 2000, 2001

Big East Player of the Year
1997 – Pat Garrity
2000 – Troy Murphy
2001 – Troy Murphy
2008 – Luke Harangody
2011 – Ben Hansbrough
Big East Rookie of the Year
1999 – Troy Murphy
2002 – Chris Thomas
Big East Most Improved Player
2012 – Jack Cooley
NIT MVP
1973 – John Shumate

For a complete list of yearly all-Americans, see: 2007–08 Notre Dame Men's Basketball Media Guide pages 176–179 (PDF copy available at 2007–08 Men's Basketball Guide)

Naismith Basketball Hall of Fame
Adrian Dantley – 2008

Fighting Irish currently in the NBA
Pat Connaughton (Milwaukee Bucks)
Blake Wesley (San Antonio Spurs)
Matt Ryan (Minnesota Timberwolves)

Fighting Irish currently in oversea leagues

 Bonzie Colson (born 1996), player for Maccabi Tel Aviv of the Israeli Basketball Premier League

See also
Big East
List of teams with the most victories in NCAA Division I men's college basketball
Notre Dame–UCLA rivalry

References

External links